Gworok, also known as Gworog (Hausa: Kagoro), is a large town in southern Kaduna State, Middle Belt Nigeria. It is located in the Kaura Local Government Area. Gworok is a Christian-dominated town. It is home to many missionaries, attracted by the cool weather and relatively high altitude. Gworog has a post office. Other places in Kagoro are Malagum and Tum.

Geography

Landscape
 
The Gworog or Kagoro Hills possesses an elevation of 1152m and a prominence of 120m.

Climate

Education
The Catholic Society of African Missions (SMA) has its northern Nigeria headquarters in Gworok, and the Evangelical Church Winning All (ECWA) denomination has a strong presence there, with both a theological college and a School of Health Technology.

Economy

Tourism
Gworog is attractive for tourists because of its mountainous scenery and cultural events such as the Afan Festival, a National festival which is celebrated annually on 1 January.

Cultural festivals

Gworog is notable for its Afan National Festival, celebrated on January 1 of every year, with people coming from different parts of the country to join the celebration.

Culture

Traditional stool
The Gworog (Kagoro) Chiefdom was created in 1905 by the British colonial administration as one of the three independent Districts in Southern Zaria province (now Southern Kaduna). As of 2020, it is a First-Class Chiefdom with its capital at Ucyo (H. Fadan Kagoro). Its rulers, as are known by the name, "Əgwam."

During the long reign of the late Chief Dr. Gwamna Awan (MBE, OON), Gworog was considered strategic during political campaigning, as politicians would visit him to receive his blessing and endorsement. The current as of early 2021 is Əgwam Əgworog (Chief of Gworog (Kagoro)) Əgwam Ufuwai Bonet (CON).

Language
The people of Gworog (the Əgworog) speak Gworog language

Counting in Gworog
 Ənyyuŋ
 Əfyyaŋ
 Ətad
 Ənay
 Ətswon
 Uta
 Natad
 Unaymbwag
 Kubanyyuŋ
 Swag
 Swag bə ənyyuŋ
 Swag bə əfyyaŋ
 Swag bə ətad
 Swag bə ənay
 Swag bə ətswon
 Swag bə uta
 Swag bə natad
 Swag bə unaymbwag
 Swag bə kubanyyuŋ
 Nswag nfyyaŋ

Notable people
 Lois Auta, an activist,  founder and CEO of Cedar Seed Foundation
 Dr. Gwamna Awan (MBE, OON): One of the lonɡest-served monarch in Africa (63 years on the throne, 1945 - 2008).
 Pst. Chris Delvan Gwamna Ajiyat: A minister of the Gospel and singer, based in Kaduna, Nigeria.
 Sen. Danjuma Laah: Senator representinɡ Kaduna South Senatorial District (2015 - Date).
 Sen. Nenadi Esther Usman, Nigerian Minister of finance (2006 - 2007); Senator representinɡ Kaduna South Senatorial District (2011 - 2015)

See also
 List of villages in Kaduna State
 Southern Kaduna

References

Further reading

External links

Populated places in Kaduna State